Beh Bote Nga is a Philippine television situational comedy series broadcast by GMA Network. Starring Janno Gibbs and Anjo Yllana, it premiered on March 9, 1999 on the network's KiliTV line up. The series concluded on April 16, 2003. It was replaced by Nuts Entertainment in its timeslot.

The series is streaming online on YouTube.

Cast and characters

Janno Gibbs as Kot
Anjo Yllana as Tot
Joey de Leon as Tio Pot
Giselle Toengi as genie G
Steven Claude Goyong as genie G's assistant
Shermaine Santiago as Celine
Aubrey Miles as Dion
Dick Israel as Max
Tiya Pusit as Tweety
Jake Roxas as Tom
KC Montero as Jerry
Anne Curtis as genie Fer
Darlene Carbungco as Vanessa "Van"
Richard Gutierrez as Peter
Sherwin Ordonez as Parker
Ina Raymundo as Tina
Ana Roces as Maan
 Anjanette Abayari as Nina
Tom Taus Jr. as Newton
Bembol Roco
Lou Veloso
Diwata
Rod Navarro as Don Facundo
Diego Llorico
Assunta de Rossi
Joey "Pepe" Smith
Jojo Bolado
Mach Duran
Rey Aranas
VP Hernandez
Allan K. as Rocky
Gladys Guevarra
Bella Flores as genie Ginny
Ruby Rodriguez as genie Cole
Jimmy Santos as genie Santos
Natasha Ledesma
Rachel Alejandro

Accolades

References

External links
 

1999 Philippine television series debuts
2003 Philippine television series endings
Filipino-language television shows
GMA Network original programming
Philippine comedy television series
Philippine television sitcoms